John P. McCullough (born October 5, 1956) is a retired National Basketball Association (NBA) basketball player. McCullough was a Big Eight Player of the Year and NCAA All-American for the University of Oklahoma. McCullough was drafted in the fourth round of the 1979 NBA draft by the Kansas City Kings. His only season in the NBA was for the Phoenix Suns in 1981–82. McCullough was the head coach of the women's program at Oklahoma Baptist University.

On June 1, 2016, McCullough was promoted to assistant coach by the Portland Trail Blazers after spending the previous four seasons as the team's advance scout. He is a former college teammate to Trail Blazers head coach Terry Stotts.

References

External links
 
 

1956 births
Living people
American expatriate basketball people in France
American men's basketball coaches
American men's basketball players
American women's basketball coaches
Basketball coaches from Ohio
Basketball players from Ohio
Billings Volcanos players
Élan Béarnais players
Kansas City Kings draft picks
Ohio Mixers players
Oklahoma Baptist Lady Bison basketball coaches
Oklahoma Sooners men's basketball players
Phoenix Suns players
Point guards
Portland Trail Blazers assistant coaches
Portland Trail Blazers scouts
Sportspeople from Lima, Ohio